Louie is a Chinese surname. 

 Alexina Louie (born 1949), Canadian composer
 Janis Louie (born 1971), chemistry professor working at the University of Utah
 Brandt C. Louie (born 1943), Canadian accountant and businessman
 Clarence Louie (born 1960), Canadian First Nations leader and businessman
 David M. Louie (born 1951), American attorney, former Attorney General of Hawaii
 David Wong Louie (born 1954), American novelist, short story writer and essayist.
 Gilman Louie (born 1960), American game designer and venture capitalist
 Juliette Louie (born 1994), Miss Hong Kong 2017 
 "Lakewood" Louie, American poker player best known for his success at the World Series of Poker in the late 1970s and early 1980s
 Steven Gwon Sheng Louie (born 1949), Canadian Chinese physicist